Stochastic transitivity models are stochastic versions of the  transitivity property of binary relations studied in mathematics. Several models of stochastic transitivity exist and have been used to describe the probabilities involved in experiments of paired comparisons, specifically in scenarios where transitivity is expected, however, empirical observations of the binary relation is probabilistic. For example, players' skills in a sport might be expected to be transitive, i.e. "if player A is better than B and B is better than C, then player A must be better than C"; however, in any given match, a weaker player might still end up winning with a positive probability. Tightly matched players might have a higher chance of observing this inversion while players with large differences in their skills might only see these inversions happen seldom. Stochastic transitivity models formalize such relations between the probabilities (e.g. of an outcome of a match) and the underlying transitive relation (e.g. the skills of the players).

A binary relation  on a set  is called transitive, in the standard non-stochastic sense, if
 and  implies 

Stochastic versions of transitivity include:
 Weak Stochastic Transitivity (WST):  and  implies , for all ;
 Strong Stochastic Transitivity (SST):  and  implies , for all ;

A toy example 
The marble game - Assume two kids, Billy and Gabriela, collect marbles. Billy collects blue marbles and Gabriela green marbles. When they get together they play a game where they mix all their marbles in a bag and sample one randomly. If the sampled marble is green, then Gabriela wins and if it is blue then Billy wins.

.

This game happens to be an example of a Bradley–Terry model.

Applications 
 Ranking and Rating - Stochastic transitivity models have been used as the basis of several ranking and rating methods. Examples include the Elo-Rating system used in chess, go, and other classical sports as well as Microsoft's TrueSkill used for the Xbox gaming platform.
 Models of Psychology and Rationality - Thurstonian models (see Case 5 in law of comparative judgement), Fechnerian models and also Luce's choice axiom are theories that have foundations on the mathematics of stochastic transitivity. Also, models of rational choice theory are based on the assumption of transitivity of preferences (see Von Neumann's utility and Debreu's Theorems), these preferences, however, are often revealed with noise in a stochastic manner.
 Machine Learning and Artificial Intelligence (see Learn to Rank) - While Elo and TrueSkill rely on specific LST models, machine learning models have been developed to rank without prior knowledge of the underlying stochastic transitivity model or under weaker than usual assumptions on the stochastic transitivity. Learning from paired comparisons is also of interest since it allows for AI agents to learn the underlying preferences of other agents.
 Game Theory - Fairness of random knockout tournaments is strongly dependent on the underlying stochastic transitivity model. Social choice theory also has foundations that depend on stochastic transitivity models.

Connections between models 
Positive Results:

 Every model that satisfies Linear Stochastic Transitivity must also satisfy Strong Stochastic Transitivity, which in turn must satisfy Weak Stochastic Transitivity. This is represented as:              LST  SSTWST ;

Negative Results:

 Stochastic transitivity models are empirically , however, they may be falsifiable;
 The  for WST, SST and LST models are in general NP-Hard, however, near optimal polynomially computable estimation procedures are known for SST and LST models.

See also 
Nontransitive game
Decision theory
Utilitarianism

References 

Transitive relations